Hope House may refer to:

 Hope House (Garden City, Kansas), a historic house in Garden City, Finney County, Kansas
 Hope House (Easton, Maryland), a historic house in Easton, Talbot County, Maryland
 Hope House (Memphis, Tennessee), a nonprofit organization in Memphis, Tennessee

See also
Hope Lodge (disambiguation)